Eulepidotis serpentifera is a moth of the family Erebidae first described by E. Brabant in 1909. It is found in the Neotropics, including French Guiana and Guyana.

References

External links
Original description: Brabant, E. (1909). "Description d'une Noctulle Nouvelle de la Guyane Française". Naturaliste. 31: 178. 

Moths described in 1909
serpentifera